Fernando J. Bonilla Ortiz (born 1962) is a Puerto Rican political figure who served as the 21st Secretary of State of the Commonwealth of Puerto Rico. Bonilla also served as the Executive Director of the Puerto Rico Ports Authority.

As Secretary of State, Bonilla was constitutionally empowered to assume the seat of Governor of Puerto Rico in case that the incumbent was incapable to do so. After the federal indictment of incumbent Governor Aníbal Acevedo Vilá, the possibility existed that Acevedo might resign his position, thereby elevating Bonilla to the seat of governor.

Early life and education
Bonilla received a Juris Doctor from the University of Puerto Rico School of Law and an LLM from Tulane University School of Law. He served as law clerk to Associate Justice of the Supreme Court of Puerto Rico Miriam Naveira from 1985–1987. Bonilla worked primarily in the private sector, specializing in maritime law.

Public service career
Bonilla was appointed Executive Director of the Puerto Rico Ports Authority in early 2005 by Governor Aníbal Acevedo Vilá. After Marisara Pont Marchese's confirmation was rejected by the House of Representatives of Puerto Rico for the post of Secretary of State, Governor Acevedo turned to Bonilla and nominated him in the summer of 2005 for the position. He was confirmed by both houses of the Legislative Assembly of Puerto Rico and effectively began serving in both posts.

In Puerto Rico, the Secretary of State has the role, but not the official title, of Lieutenant Governor, in addition to heading the State Department. However, the Constitution provides that whenever the Governor is unable to carry out his duties, dies, is impeached or resigns, the Secretary of State shall succeed in the post. If Governor Aníbal Acevedo Vilá would have resigned after the federal indictment of March 27, 2008, Bonilla would have assumed the governorship.

On January 2, 2009, after fulfilling the traditional role of serving as the initial Master of Ceremony of incoming Governor Luis Fortuño's Inaugural Ceremonies, he introduced and turned over that role to his successor, former Puerto Rico Senate President Kenneth McClintock, who, coincidentally, was also a fellow Tulane University School of Law graduate.

References

External links
Biography in Spanish (Archived)

Living people
Popular Democratic Party (Puerto Rico) politicians
Secretaries of State of Puerto Rico
Puerto Rican people of Spanish descent
Tulane University Law School alumni
1962 births
University of Puerto Rico alumni